Nomreh-ye Davazdah (also Romanized as Nomreh-ye Davāzdah) is a village in Gazin Rural District, Raghiveh District, Haftgel County, Khuzestan Province, Iran. At the 2006 census, its population was 52, in 9 families.

References 

Populated places in Haftkel County